Prithiraj Rava (born 1959) is a politician and actor of Assam. He was elected to the Assam Legislative Assembly from Tezpur (Vidhan Sabha constituency) in the 2021 Assam Legislative Assembly election as a member of the Asom Gana Parishad.
He is the son of Bishnu Rava, an artist of Assam.  He starred in the Assamese films Srimanta Sankardeva (2010), Ahetuk, Lakhimi and Firingoti.

References

External links 

Living people
Male actors in Assamese cinema
Male actors from Assam
Indian politicians

1957 births
Assam MLAs 2021–2026
Asom Gana Parishad politicians
People from Sonitpur district